Liu Ruopeng (is a Chinese entrepreneur who founded the conglomerate Kuang-Chi. He is also a member of the Communist Party of China and a National People's Congress deputy.

Early life
Liu has a bachelor's degree in engineering from Zhejiang University. He has a master's degree and a doctorate from Duke University.

Career
While a PhD student at Duke University, Liu allegedly stole intellectual property from a United States Department of Defense-funded laboratory and passed it to Chinese researchers, which eventually resulted in his expulsion from the David R. Smith research group at the university. Liu was investigated by the F.B.I., but ultimately was not charged with a crime. The incident is the subject of a book by ProPublica senior editor Daniel Golden, Spy Schools: How the CIA, FBI, and Foreign Intelligence Secretly Exploit America's Universities.

In 2015, Liu bought a controlling stake in the loss making New Zealand company Martin Aircraft Company, makers of the yet to be commercially viable Martin Jetpack.

He is the president of the Shenzhen-based Kuang-Chi Institute of Advanced Technology and the chairman of Hong Kong-listed KuangChi Science.

Personal life
Liu Ruopeng lives in Shenzhen, China.

References

Living people
People from Shenzhen
Zhejiang University alumni
Duke University alumni
Chinese technology company founders
Chinese billionaires
Year of birth missing (living people)
Chinese expatriates in the United States
Businesspeople from Guangdong
1980s births